Jerguillicola is a genus of trematodes in the family Opecoelidae. It consists of one species, Jerguillicola leonora Bray, 2002.

References

Opecoelidae
Plagiorchiida genera
Monotypic platyhelminthes genera